Gilbert Einstein McKeeby (November 4, 1844April 24, 1905) was an American physician and politician.  He was a member of the Wisconsin State Senate, representing Adams and Columbia counties.

Biography
McKeeby was born on November 4, 1844 in Bath Township, Summit County, Ohio. His family moved to Oregon, Wisconsin when he was two years old. During the American Civil War, he served with the 1st Wisconsin Heavy Artillery Regiment of the Union Army. In 1868, McKeeby graduated from the Bellevue Hospital Medical College. He then relocated to Lodi, Wisconsin, in 1868 and practiced medicine in there for 14 years. He married Carrie N. Ansdell in 1869. He moved to Red Cloud, Nebraska in 1882, to Guthrie, Oklahoma, in 1896, and then to Pueblo, Colorado, in 1901, where he died in 1905.

Political career
McKeeby represented the 27th State Senate district during the 1881 and 1882 sessions. Later, he was mayor of Red Cloud, Nebraska in 1888. McKeeby edited the Red Cloud Republican and served in the Nebraska State Senate. He was a Republican.

References

People from Bath Township, Summit County, Ohio
People from Oregon, Wisconsin
People from Lodi, Wisconsin
People from Red Cloud, Nebraska
Republican Party Nebraska state senators
Republican Party Wisconsin state senators
Mayors of places in Nebraska
People of Wisconsin in the American Civil War
Union Army soldiers
Physicians from Wisconsin
Physicians from Nebraska
Editors of Nebraska newspapers
1844 births
1905 deaths
Journalists from Ohio